Beerbongs & Bentleys (stylized in lowercase) is the second studio album by American rapper and singer Post Malone, released by Republic Records on April 27, 2018. The album features guest appearances from Swae Lee, 21 Savage, Ty Dolla Sign, Nicki Minaj, G-Eazy, and YG. It includes production from frequent collaborators Louis Bell and Frank Dukes, alongside London on da Track, Andrew Watt, Tank God, Twice as Nice, Teddy Walton, Scott Storch, and PartyNextDoor, among others.

Beerbongs & Bentleys was a commercial success, debuting at number one on the US Billboard 200, with 461,000 album-equivalent units, 153,000 of which were in pure sales. It also broke streaming records on Spotify having gained 47.9 million streams in the US in the first day of its release. The album was supported by five singles: "Rockstar", "Candy Paint", "Psycho", "Ball for Me", and "Better Now", with "Rockstar" and "Psycho" peaking at number one on the US Billboard Hot 100. The album broke the record for the most simultaneous top 20 entries on the Billboard Hot 100  with nine songs in the top 20 of the chart.

While Beerbongs & Bentleys received mixed reviews from critics, it was included in several year-end lists of the best albums of 2018. The album was certified five-times platinum by the Recording Industry Association of America (RIAA), and was nominated for Album of the Year at the 2019 Grammy Awards.

Singles
The album's lead single, "Rockstar" featuring 21 Savage, was released for digital download on September 15, 2017. It was later sent to rhythmic and contemporary hit radio on September 26, 2017. The song peaked at number one on the US Billboard Hot 100, becoming Post Malone and 21 Savage's first number-one song.

The album's second single, "Candy Paint", was released on October 20, 2017. The song peaked at number 34 on the Billboard Hot 100.

The album's third single, "Psycho" featuring Ty Dolla Sign, was released for digital download on February 23, 2018. It was later sent to rhythmic contemporary radio on February 27, 2018. The song debuted at number two and later peaked at number one on the Billboard Hot 100.

"Ball for Me" featuring Nicki Minaj, was sent to rhythmic contemporary radio on May 8, 2018, as the album's fourth single. The song peaked at number 16 on the Billboard Hot 100.

"Better Now" was sent to UK contemporary hit radio on May 25, 2018 and US contemporary hit radio on June 5, 2018, as the album's fifth single. The song peaked at number three on the Billboard Hot 100.

Critical reception

Beerbongs & Bentleys was met with mixed reviews. At Metacritic, which assigns a normalized rating out of 100 to reviews from professional publications, the album received an average score of 51, based on 10 reviews. Aggregator AnyDecentMusic? gave it 4.8 out of 10, based on their assessment of the critical consensus.

Alexis Petridis of The Guardian complimented the album's production, hooks and Post Malone's voice, but criticized Malone's lyrics: "Over a protracted period of time – and Beerbongs & Bentleys goes on and on like a charity telethon – there's a paucity of original ideas, the sense that he has virtually nothing to say for himself, and that whatever he has, has already been said umpteen times before with considerably more skill, wit and impact." Larry Bartleet of NME described the album as "voguish, trap-flavoured blandness", concluding Beerbongs & Bentleys is "more of a stultifying moodboard than an album with something to say" and that "its 18 tracks are homogenous playlist fodder targeted at the streaming machine". Andrew Unterberger of Billboard commented that "the album doesn't throw enough different looks at listeners to justify its 18-track length, leading to an inevitable second-half sag" but "it does have a couple moments that see Post stretching his musical boundaries, to promising effect". Neil Z. Yeung of AllMusic said, "Beerbongs & Bentleys is an apt reflection of his lavish lifestyle and his subsequently begotten hardships, but its attempts at sincerity work only when Post Malone stops trying so hard". Evan Rytlewski of Pitchfork concluded that Beerbongs & Bentleys "plays to Post's greatest strength: his melodic instincts. His best hooks are so tuneful and airless they directly target the ear's pleasure centers", but "Post Malone's singular, dour mood wears thin and grows stale after too long".

Daniela Campos of Exclaim! wrote that the album represents "a focus on a rock-star rapper's lifestyle that's being pushed to the forefront for the public eye to decipher". Jordan M. of Sputnikmusic saying "This moment of fuzzed-out, fucked-up pop music with questionably scant odes to rap music is not designed for posterity. To his credit, Post gets that, and is content to make overlong albums where every song can be a single. Not every song on Beerbongs & Bentleys can be a single, but there's enough of them hiding in there to make it one of 2018's more rewarding releases".

Year-end lists

Industry awards

Commercial performance
In the United States, on the day of its release, Beerbongs & Bentleys broke streaming records on Spotify. The album achieved 47.9 million streams in the US and 78,744,000 streams globally on the music service within 24 hours. 

The album debuted at number one on the US Billboard 200, opening with 461,000 album-equivalent units in its first week, with 153,000 coming from pure sales. It logged the largest week of the year for an album, and the biggest streaming week ever with 431.3 million on-demand audio streams in the country, surpassing the previous record held by Drake's More Life (2017), which started with 384.8 million. In its second week, Beerbongs & Bentleys achieved 193,000 album-equivalent sales, 24,000 of which were pure sales, raising its two-week total to 663,000 album-equivalent sales. It remained atop the chart for a third week, with 147,000 album-equivalent units, including 18,000 pure sales. The following week, the album fell to number two with 123,000 album-equivalent units following the debut of Love Yourself: Tear by the Korean boy band BTS. On April 22, 2021, it was certified five-times platinum by the Recording Industry Association of America (RIAA) for combined sales, streaming and track-sale equivalents of five million units in the United States.

On May 12, 2018, Beerbongs & Bentleys broke the record for the most simultaneous top 20 entries on the US Billboard Hot 100 songs chart with nine songs in the top 20 of the Hot 100, shattering the previous record of six, which was shared by the Beatles and J. Cole. The Beatles held the record for 54 years, as they charted six songs in the top 20 on charts dated April 11 and 18, 1964. J. Cole tied the mark on May 5, 2018. Malone also broke the record for the most simultaneous top 40 Hot 100 hits: 14.

In the United Kingdom, Beerbongs & Bentleys debuted at number one, moving 46,000 album-equivalent units in its first week, with 35,000 units coming from streaming, giving Post Malone the third biggest opening week of streams for an album in the UK of all time.

In 2018, Beerbongs & Bentleys was ranked as the third most popular album of the year on the Billboard 200. The album finished 2018 having sold over 3,251,000 album-equivalent units in the US, with over 374,000 being pure sales. During 2019, it sold 1,258,000 album-equivalent units in the US, with over 78,000 being pure sales.

Track listing

Notes
  signifies a co-producer
  signifies an additional producer
  signifies an uncredited writer
 "Takin' Shots" features background vocals by PartyNextDoor
 "Stay" features background vocals by Andrew Watt

Sample credits
 "Same Bitches" contains interpolations from "Time of the Season", written by Rod Argent.
 "92 Explorer" contains interpolations from "Money Counter", written by Jaison Harris.

Personnel
Musicians
 Austin Post – guitar (tracks 7, 12)
 Andrew Watt – guitar, bass (tracks 7, 12), keyboards (track 7)
 Tommy Lee – drums (track 7)
 Louis Bell – drum programming, keyboards (track 7)
 Twice as Nice – drum programming (track 15)

Technical
 Louis Bell – recording (tracks 1–11, 13, 15–18), vocal production
 Ethan Stevens – recording (track 6)
 Lorenzo Cardona – recording (track 6)
 Samuel Ahana – recording (track 14)
 Roark Bailey – recording (track 16)
 Manny Marroquin – mixing (tracks 1–3, 4–11, 13, 14 16, 18)
 David Nakaji – mixing (tracks 3, 15)
 Spike Stent – mixing (track 12)
 Joe Fitz – mixing (track 17)
 Chris Galland – mixing assistance (tracks 1, 2, 4–11, 13, 14, 16, 18)
 Robin Florent – mixing assistance (tracks 1, 2, 4–11, 13, 14, 16, 18)
 Scott Desmarais – mixing assistance (tracks 1, 2, 4–11, 13, 14, 16, 18)
 Mike Bozzi – mastering

Charts

Weekly charts

Year-end charts

Decade-end charts

Certifications

Release history

References

2018 albums
Post Malone albums
Albums produced by Post Malone
Republic Records albums
Albums produced by Andrew Watt (record producer)
Albums produced by Frank Dukes
Albums produced by London on da Track
Albums produced by Louis Bell
Albums produced by PartyNextDoor
Albums produced by Scott Storch
Juno Award for International Album of the Year albums